Bryan Salazar (born October 17, 1994) is an American soccer player.

Career

Youth
Salazar joined The Houston Dynamo Junior Academy at the age of 13, eventually progressing to the Dynamo U-18 squad.

Professional
On February 13, 2013, Salazar signed his first professional contract, joining the Dynamo senior squad.  In doing so, Salazar became the fifth Dynamo academy player to be signed under the MLS' Homegrown Player Rule.  Salazar made his professional debut on May 30, 2013 in Houston's 2-0 U.S. Open Cup victory over FC Tucson, starting at forward and playing 60 minutes.

Prior to the start of the 2014 season, Salazar, along with teammates Anthony Arena and Jason Johnson, was loaned to the Dynamo's USL Pro affiliate, the Pittsburgh Riverhounds.

Honours

International
Mexico Youth
CONCACAF U-17 Championship: 2015

References

External links

1994 births
Living people
American soccer players
Houston Dynamo FC players
Pittsburgh Riverhounds SC players
Association football midfielders
Soccer players from Houston
USL Championship players